William Rimmer (1862–1936) was a Lancashire composer and conductor of brass band music who was particularly well known for his marches.

Rimmer was born in Southport in 1862 into a musical family.  His father was bandmaster of the Lancashire Volunteer Rifles and encouraged both Rimmer and his brother Robert in their musical studies. At the age of 15 Rimmer joined the Southport Rifle band as a side-drummer and then moved on to the cornet, eventually becoming the band's principal cornet soloist.  As a young man he made himself into one of the finest cornet players in the country under the eye of Alexander Owen at Besses o' th' Barn Band.  His prowess on the instrument became well known, and he was engaged as a soloist by many of the best bands of the day.  He eventually gave up playing to concentrate on training and conducting bands.  He started his conducting career with the Skelmersdale Old Band and the Skelmersdale Temperance Band where he saw excellent success at local contests from 1891 to 1895. Then like most of the top brass band conductors of his generation, he became associated with many different bands in the Lancashire area. At the height of his fame conducted every winning band at both the Crystal Palace and Belle Vue competitions between 1905 and 1909.

In 1999, a CD dedicated to his music, recorded by Fodens Courtois Band, was released on the Doyen label (DOY CD080).

On 29 July 2007, Phillip Hunt devoted his weekly "Sounds of Brass" radio programme on BBC Radio Devon to Rimmer and his works.

Selected works

Arizona Belle
Australasian, The
Avenger, The
Black Knight, The
Blencathra
Carnival King, The
Cavalier, The
Chivalry
Commonwealth, The
Cossack, The
Cross of Honour, The
Cycle Parade, The
Dauntless
Dawn of Freedom
Deeds of Daring
Echoes Of Scotland
Faithful and Free
Farewell My Comrades
For Freedom and Honour
Grenadier
Hailstorm (Cornet Polka)
Harlequin
Heroes of Liberty
Hercules
Honest Toil
Honour the Brave
Impregnable
In Cellar Cool
Indomitable
Irresistible
Jenny Jones
King's Courier, The
King's Cavalier, The
Knights of the road
La Russe
Les Zephyrs
Marathon
North Star, The
Northumbrian, The
Old Comrades
One of the Best
Orion
Punchinello
Queen of the South
Ravenswood
Rays of Glory
Red Gauntlet
Royal Trophy, The
Rule Britannia
Russe, La
RUSTIC SCENES
Salome
Slaidburn
SELECTION from the Works of LISZT
SELECTION from Carmen
Sons of the Wild
Sons of Victory
Valorous
Victors Return, 
Viva Birkinshaw
Viva Pettee

References

English composers
Brass band composers
1862 births
1936 deaths